Lucas de Souza Cunha (born 23 January 1997) is a Brazilian footballer who plays as a centre back for Red Bull Bragantino.

Club career
Born in Três Lagoas, Mato Grosso, Cunha played as a youth for Mirassol Futebol Clube in São Paulo state before joining S.C. Braga.

Cunha made his professional debut in the Segunda Liga for Braga B on 30 September 2015 in a 1–0 loss at Covilhã. He scored his first goal on 19 April 2017 in a 3–1 win at S.C. Olhanense, from the penalty spot.

On 25 August 2019, Cunha debuted in Primeira Liga for Braga's first team, in a 1–1 draw at Gil Vicente. Days earlier, he signed a new four-year deal with a €25 million buyout clause. With only two more appearances to his name – including a UEFA Europa League debut – he moved on loan to G.D. Estoril Praia of the second division for the rest of the season.

On 10 September 2020, Cunha joined La Liga side RC Celta de Vigo on loan, being initially assigned to the reserves in Segunda División B.

On 30 June 2021, he joined Primeira Liga club Gil Vicente on a three-year contract.

International
Cunha represented Brazil under-20 at the 2017 South American Youth Football Championship.

Career statistics

Club

References

External links

1997 births
People from Três Lagoas
Living people
Brazilian footballers
Brazil youth international footballers
Association football defenders
Mirassol Futebol Clube players
S.C. Braga players
S.C. Braga B players
G.D. Estoril Praia players
Celta de Vigo B players
Gil Vicente F.C. players
Red Bull Bragantino players
Primeira Liga players
Liga Portugal 2 players
Campeonato de Portugal (league) players
Segunda División B players
Brazilian expatriate footballers
Brazilian expatriate sportspeople in Portugal
Brazilian expatriate sportspeople in Spain
Expatriate footballers in Portugal
Expatriate footballers in Spain
Sportspeople from Mato Grosso do Sul